Kim Kum-ok ( or  ; born December 9, 1988) is a female long-distance runner and politician from North Korea, who specializes in the half marathon and marathon events. She represents the April 25 Sports Team.

Kim ran in the Pyongyang Marathon in 2006 and took third with a time of 2:29:25. She improved for the 2007 edition, setting a marathon personal best of 2:26:56 to take second place. She had her first success at collegiate level, winning the half marathon at the 2007 Summer Universiade. Having won at the age of eighteen, the win was North Korea's second ever title at the Universiade. She ran at the Beijing Marathon later that year and managed tenth place.

At the Hong Kong Marathon, she had her first victory over the distance. She represented North Korea at the 2008 Summer Olympics and took twelfth place in the Olympic marathon race. The following year she returned to the Pyongyang Marathon and finished second again, this time to Phyo Un-suk. She ran at the 2009 World Championships in Athletics later that year and finished in twentieth place in the World Championship marathon race with a time of 2:31:24 (the best performer of the North Korean team). She ended her 2009 season by running a half marathon best of 1:11:55 to win at the 2009 East Asian Games.

In her fourth attempt at the course, Kim won the Pyongyang Marathon in 2:27:34, running her second fastest ever marathon and seeing off two-time champion Jong Yong-ok to take the honours.

Kim was elected to North Korea's Supreme People's Assembly in the 2009 North Korean parliamentary election, representing the 609th Electoral District, and in 2014, representing the 606th.

Achievements

Personal bests
 Half marathon – 1:11:55 hrs (2009)
 Marathon – 2:26:56 hrs (2007)

References

External links
 

1988 births
Living people
North Korean female marathon runners
Athletes (track and field) at the 2008 Summer Olympics
Athletes (track and field) at the 2012 Summer Olympics
Athletes (track and field) at the 2016 Summer Olympics
Olympic athletes of North Korea
Asian Games medalists in athletics (track and field)
Athletes (track and field) at the 2010 Asian Games
North Korean female long-distance runners
World Athletics Championships athletes for North Korea
Asian Games bronze medalists for North Korea
Medalists at the 2010 Asian Games
Universiade medalists in athletics (track and field)
Universiade gold medalists for North Korea
20th-century North Korean women
21st-century North Korean women